Chingizid gobiana is a moth in the family Cossidae. It was described by Franz Daniel in 1970. It is found in Mongolia.

References

Cossinae
Moths described in 1970
Moths of Asia